Robert Randolph may refer to:

 Robert Randolph and the Family Band, American funk and soul band led by pedal steel guitarist Robert Randolph.
 Robert Randolph (priest), medieval English priest.

See also
 Robert Randolph Bruce (1861–1942), 13th Lieutenant Governor of British Columbia, Canada.
 Robert R. Casey (full name: Robert Randolph Casey; 1915–1986), United States politician.
 Sir Robert Garran (full name: Robert Randolph Garran; 1867–1957), Australian lawyer and public servant.